Ángelo Nicolás Sagal Tapia (born 18 April 1993) is a Chilean footballer who plays as a forward for Hungarian OTP Bank Liga club Ferencváros on loan from Gaziantep.

International career
He got his first call up to the senior Chile squad for a friendly against the United States in January 2015 and made his international debut in the match. At 2017 China Cup, he scored his first international match goal, which made La Roja win the cup.

International goals
Scores and results list Chile's goal tally first.

Personal life
His younger brother, Bastián, is a footballer who was with the Mexican clubs Tlaxcala and Pachuca before joining Ñublense in 2022.

Sagal is the cousin of the former professional footballer Nino Rojas and the nephew of Bernardino "Loco Nino" Rojas, father of Nino, a well-known footballer in his city of birth, Talca.

Honours
Chile
China Cup: 2017

References

External links
 
 

1993 births
Living people
People from Talca
Chilean footballers
Chilean expatriate footballers
Chile international footballers
Rangers de Talca footballers
C.D. Huachipato footballers
C.F. Pachuca players
FC Juárez footballers
Denizlispor footballers
Gaziantep F.K. footballers
Ferencvárosi TC footballers
Chilean Primera División players
Liga MX players
Süper Lig players
Chilean expatriate sportspeople in Mexico
Chilean expatriate sportspeople in Turkey
Chilean expatriate sportspeople in Hungary
Expatriate footballers in Mexico
Expatriate footballers in Turkey
Expatriate footballers in Hungary
Association football forwards
2017 FIFA Confederations Cup players
2019 Copa América players